Hilde Tellesbø (born 1963) is a Norwegian orienteering competitor. She received a silver medal in the relay event at the 1985 World Orienteering Championships in Bendigo, together with Ragnhild Bratberg, Helle Johansen and Ellen-Sofie Olsvik.

References

1963 births
Living people
Norwegian orienteers
Female orienteers
Foot orienteers
World Orienteering Championships medalists
20th-century Norwegian women